Elizabeth Ness MacBean Ross (14 February 1878  14 February 1915) was a Scottish physician who worked in Persia (presently Iran) among the Bakhtiari people. With training and a post-graduate qualification in tropical medicine, she responded to an appeal for doctors by the Serbian government in 1915 and treated Serbian casualties, most of whom were victims of typhus. Ross's life and work is commemorated by a plaque in her home town of Tain and her death anniversary is commemorated by ceremonies in Serbia, on 14 February.

Early life and family
Elizabeth Ness MacBean Ross was born in Hampstead, London, to Scottish parents. Her father, Donald Alexander MacBean Ross (18491893), manager of the London branch of the Commercial Bank of Scotland, was originally from Inverness, while her mother, Elizabeth Wilson Ross (née Ness) was from Tain. 

When her father died, they moved to her mother's family in Tain, where she attended Tain Royal Academy. She went on to study medicine at Queen Margaret College, Glasgow, in 1896. This was some two years after Marion Gilchrist, the first woman to qualify in medicine from a university in Scotland, had graduated. Ross graduated with an MB ChB in 1901.

Lucy, one of Ross's sisters, also graduated in medicine and became a doctor in York. James Ness MacBean Ross, her brother, became a naval doctor and was awarded the Military Cross and bar and the Croix de Guerre during the First World War.

Early career 

After graduation Ross worked in Tain and then as a medical officer on the Scottish island of Colonsay. She then spent eighteen months in practice in East Ham in London. She accepted a post in Isfahan province as assistant to an Armenian physician in the city of Isfahan before setting up in practice on her own. Returning on leave to the UK she passed the examination to gain the Diploma in Tropical Medicine. On her return to Persia, she met Samsam al-Saltane (1846–1930), prime minister of Persia and at his suggestion began to work with Bakhtiari people of south west Persia. 

Adopting their customs and their dress, she became integrated to such an extent that she was made an honorary chief of the Bakhtiari. She wrote a book describing her experience among them, A Lady Doctor in Bakhtiari Land, which was published posthumously with her brother James as editor. In this, she provided "first-hand information as to the life, the point of view, and the changing conditions among these virile, if unstable, tribesmen."

In 1913, she successfully applied for a job as a ship's surgeon on the SS Nigaristan to work her way home. She subsequently became ship's surgeon on the Glasgow Line SS Glenlogan, a post which took her to India and Japan before she returned to Isfahan in 1914.

Serbia 

On the outbreak of the First World War she read of the need for doctors in Serbia. The first phase of the Austro-Hungarian campaign against Serbia had resulted in the Serbian army suffering heavy casualties and a typhus epidemic among the military and the civilian populations. The epidemic reached its height in March 1915 when it was estimated that around 150,000 people were affected, of whom some 30,000 died.

Elizabeth Ross arrived in January 1915 and volunteered to work in Kragujevac, the city worst affected by the epidemic, accounting for almost 10 percent of all cases in Serbia. The large military hospital where she worked was overcrowded with typhus victims. The conditions under which Ross worked were described by Louise Fraser, a nurse who visited her from the nearby Scottish Women's Hospital, who wrote that she had seen "some of the worst slum dwellings in Britain, but never anything to approach these wards in filth and squalor."

At that time the louse-borne transmission of the disease was not fully understood, but the need for cleanliness, disinfection and isolation of victims was. These proved impossible to achieve in the military hospital at that time and the mortality rate from typhus in Kragujevac was particularly high, estimated by Colonel William Hunter of the British Military Sanitary Mission to Serbia at 40–50%.

Death and legacy

Ross died from typhus on her 37th birthday, 14 February 1915, three weeks after arriving in Kragujevac. She is buried in the cemetery in Kragujevac, the inscription on her gravestone including, in Serbian, the text: "In memory of Dr. E. Ross and two nurses who died in 1915 in our town while attending to our ill and wounded soldiers. Grateful soldiers from the Saloniki front. Renewed 1977."

There is a plaque in her memory in St Duthac's Church, Tain. which includes the words "This tablet has been erected and hospital beds endowed in Serbia by public subscription in remembrance of the noble life and sacrifice of one whose home was for many years in Tain."

In 2015, Ross was one of six British women to feature on a commemorative set of postage stamps issued by Serbia Post.

The local Red Cross youth branch in Kragujevac is named the Dr Elizabeth Ross Society. At the annual commemoration ceremony they wear t-shirts bearing Ross's graduation photograph. Elizabeth Ross Street in Kragujevac is named after her. A street in the town is named in her honour. On 14 February, her birth and death date, memorial ceremonies are held each year in Kragujevac and at other locations in Serbia to commemorate her work for the people of Serbia.

See also
 People on Scottish banknotes
Elsie Inglis Memorial Maternity Hospital
Scottish Women's Hospitals for Foreign Service
 Eveline Haverfield
 Leila Paget
 Mabel St Clair Stobart
 Josephine Bedford
 Katherine Harley
 Elsie Inglis
 Isabel Emslie Hutton

References

Further reading 
 Ross, Elizabeth, edited by Ross MacBean (1921). A Lady Doctor in Bakhtiari Land. London: L. Parsons.

External links 
 

1878 births
1915 deaths
People from Tain
20th-century Scottish medical doctors
Alumni of the University of Glasgow
British Merchant Navy officers
British tropical physicians
Deaths from typhus
People educated at Tain Royal Academy
People from Hampstead
Scottish memoirists
Ship's doctors
British women in World War I
People from Ross and Cromarty
Anglo-Scots
British casualties of World War I
British expatriates in Iran